Eurema andersonii, the one-spot grass yellow or Anderson's grass yellow, is a small butterfly of the family Pieridae, that is, the yellows and whites, which is found in India, Myanmar and other parts of Asia.

Description

Subspecies and distribution
Subspecies are:
E. a. andersoni (Moore, 1886) Peninsular Malaya, Langkawi, Singapore, Sumatra, Borneo, Thailand and Indo-China
E. a. godana (Fruhstorfer, 1910) Taiwan
E. a. udana (Fruhstorfer, 1910) West Java
E. a. ormistoni (Watkins, 1925) South India
E. a. anamba (Corbet & Pendlebury, 1932) Anambas
E. a. evansi (Corbet & Pendlebury, 1932) Andaman
E. a. jordani (Corbet & Pendlebury, 1932) Sikkim and Bhutan
E. a. konoyi (Morishita, 1973) Palawan
E. a. nishiyamai (Shirôzu & Yata, 1981) Nias Island
E. a. kashiwaii (Shirôzu & Yata, 1981) Sumba Island
E. a. sadanobui (Shirôzu & Yata, 1982) Thailand, Laos, Cambodia, southern Vietnam, and southern Yunnan
E. a. albida (Shirôzu & Yata, 1982) Borneo (Sarawak)
E. a. shimai (Yata & Gaonkar, 1999) southern India

Life cycle
The larvae have been recorded on Ventilago goughii.

See also
List of butterflies of India
List of butterflies of India (Pieridae)

References

External links

andersonii
Butterflies of Singapore
Butterflies described in 1886
Butterflies of Asia